The FIBT World Championships 1935 took place in Igls, Austria (Two-man) and in St. Moritz, Switzerland (Four-man). St. Moritz hosted the four-man event previously in 1931.

Two man bobsleigh

Four man bobsleigh

Medal table

References
2-Man bobsleigh World Champions
4-Man bobsleigh World Champions

1935
1935 in Austrian sport
Sport in St. Moritz
1935 in bobsleigh
International sports competitions hosted by Austria
Bobsleigh in Austria